A Spy of Napoleon is a 1934 historical novel by the British writer Baroness Emmuska Orczy. An illegitimate daughter of Louis Napoleon is taken on as an agent by Napoleon III, ruler of France, who wishes her to marry into and spy on the aristocracy who he suspects of wanting to overthrow him. Her lover, meanwhile, is sent to Switzerland to infiltrate revolutionaries there.

Adaptation
In 1936 it was made into a film Spy of Napoleon starring Richard Barthelmess, Dolly Haas and James Carew.

References

Historical novels
1934 British novels
Novels by Baroness Emma Orczy
Hodder & Stoughton books
Cultural depictions of Napoleon III
British novels adapted into films